Buckingham County may refer to:
 Buckingham County, Virginia, United States
 Buckingham Land District, formerly Buckingham County, Tasmania, Australia
 County of Buckingham (South Australia)
 Buckinghamshire, ceremonial county, England, United Kingdom